Iganga Boys' Boarding Primary School  is located in Iganga District in Uganda along Jinja Road.

History
Iganga Boys' Boarding Primary School was founded in 1919 by Church Missionary Society.It's now a government aided boys' boarding school covering primary one to primary seven. The student population is 1,000.

References

Boys' schools in Uganda
Boarding schools in Uganda
Primary schools in Uganda
Educational institutions established in 1919
1919 establishments in Uganda